Adrian Keith Goldsworthy (born 1969) is a British historian and novelist who specialises in ancient Roman history.

Education
Adrian Goldsworthy attended Westbourne School, Penarth. He then read Ancient and Modern History at St John's College, Oxford, completing a D.Phil. in ancient military history from the University of Oxford in 1994. That dissertation laid the foundation of his first book, The Roman Army at War 100 BC – AD 200.

Career
Goldsworthy was appointed a Junior Research Fellow at Cardiff University for two years, taught briefly at King's College London and was an assistant professor on the University of Notre Dame's London programme for six years. His expertise is in Roman history, but he has also taught a course on the military history of the Second World War.

Goldsworthy has appeared on History Channel documentaries and the television game show Time Commanders, serving as an expert on battles being fought by the contestants, and he gave a speech about Roman history and politics to the cast of a 2010 Liverpool production of Shakespeare's Antony and Cleopatra.

In 2010 Goldsworthy began writing a series of military novels - based not in Roman times but in the Napoleonic era and concentrating on Wellington's redcoat army, another period in which he has great interest. His first novel, True Soldier Gentlemen, was published by Weidenfeld & Nicolson in 2011 and was followed by Beat the Drums Slowly and Send Me Safely Back Again. The titles of each of his novels are taken from the lyrics of popular military songs of the period.

Asked about his philosophy of life, Goldsworthy responded that he was "English, so obviously do not have a philosophy. I am a Christian, though, if you want to know about important beliefs." Goldsworthy lives in South Wales.

Works
Goldsworthy has written several historical works on ancient Rome, especially the Roman army, and nine novels.

Nonfiction
The Roman Army at War 100 BC – AD 200 (OUP, 1996)
Roman Warfare (Cassell, 2000) 
The Punic Wars (Cassell, 2000) 
Reprint title: The Fall of Carthage: The Punic Wars 265–146 BC, (Cassell, 2003) 
Fields of Battle: Cannae (Orion, 2001) 
Caesar's Civil War: 49–44 BC (2002), Osprey Publishing
In the Name of Rome: The Men Who Won the Roman Empire (Orion, 2003) 
The Complete Roman Army (Thames & Hudson, 2003)  
Caesar, Life of a Colossus, (Yale University Press, 2006) 
The Fall of the West: The Death of the Roman Superpower (Orion 2009)
U.S. title: How Rome Fell: Death of a Superpower, (Yale University Press, 2009) 
Antony and Cleopatra (2010); Yale University Press
 Augustus: First Emperor of Rome, (Yale University Press, 2014) 
 Pax Romana. War, Peace and Conquest in the Roman World, (Orion Publishing Co, 2016) 528 p  
 Hadrian's Wall (Basic Books, 2018). 
 Philip and Alexander: Kings and Conquerors (Head of Zeus, 2020)

Novels
 Napoleonic Wars Series
True Soldier Gentlemen (2011), (George Weidenfeld & Nicolson) ; his first novel
 Beat the Drums Slowly (2011)
 Send Me Safely Back Again (2012)
 All in Scarlet Uniform (2013)
 Run Them Ashore (2014)
 Whose Business is to Die (2015)
Roman Britain Series
 Vindolanda (Head of Zeus, 2017) 
 The Encircling Sea (Head of Zeus, 2018) 
 Brigantia (Head of Zeus, 2019) 
 The Fort (Head of Zeus, 2021) 
 The City (Head of Zeus, 2022)

References

External links 
 

 Adrian Goldsworthy's website
 Audio interview with Goldsworthy at National Review Online
 Audio podcast of talk in 2013 by Adrian Goldsworthy on Roman Warfare  at The New York Military Affairs Symposium  in NYC.

1969 births
People from Penarth
Living people
British military historians
Alumni of St John's College, Oxford
British Christians
People educated at Westbourne School, Penarth
Academics of King's College London
Historians of ancient Rome
Writers of historical fiction set in antiquity